John Allan (fl. 1850s) was a colonial Victorian politician, a member of the Victorian Legislative Council.

Allan was a  merchant and arrived in Victoria, becoming a squatter. He lived in Castlemaine when elected to the council.

References

 

Year of birth missing
Year of death missing
Members of the Victorian Legislative Council